The Patman House was a historic house at Mountain and Jackson Streets in Pangburn, Arkansas.  It was a -story T-shaped wood-frame structure, with a dormered gable roof, novelty siding, and a foundation of brick piers.  It had modest vernacular Colonial Revival styling.  It was built in the 1890s as a frame version of a dogtrot, but was significantly altered in the early 1920s, after Pangburn achieved prosperity as a railroad town.

The house was listed on the National Register of Historic Places in 1991.  It has been listed as demolished in the Arkansas Historic Preservation Program database.

See also
National Register of Historic Places listings in White County, Arkansas

References

Houses on the National Register of Historic Places in Arkansas
Colonial Revival architecture in Arkansas
Houses completed in 1920
Houses in White County, Arkansas
Demolished buildings and structures in Arkansas
National Register of Historic Places in White County, Arkansas
Dogtrot architecture in Arkansas
1920 establishments in Arkansas